Harpa queenslandica is a species of sea snail, a marine gastropod mollusk, in the family Harpidae.

Distribution
This species occurs in Great Barrier Reef.

References

queenslandica
Gastropods described in 2016